Hassan al-Jabarti (d. 1774) was a Somali mathematician, theologian, astronomer and philosopher who lived in Cairo, Egypt during the 18th century.

Biography
Al-Jabarti was the father of the historian Abd al-Rahman al-Jabarti, and originated from the Somali city of Zeila. Hassan is considered one of the great scholars of the 18th century. He frequently conducted experiments in his own house, which was visited and observed by Western students.

References

1774 deaths
Somalian religious leaders
Somalian Sunni Muslim scholars of Islam
Somalian scientists
Year of birth unknown